Hurricane Isaac was a strong and large Cape Verde hurricane that lasted through late September and early October 2000. The thirteenth tropical cyclone, ninth named storm, and the fifth hurricane of 2000 Atlantic hurricane season, Isaac developed from a tropical wave south of Cape Verde on September 21. The depression intensified, and on the following day, it was upgraded to Tropical Storm Isaac. Due to conductive atmospheric conditions, Isaac continued to strengthen, and attained hurricane intensity on September 23. Isaac managed to become a Category 3 hurricane on September 24, before steadily weakening shortly thereafter. By September 26, the storm had deteriorated to a Category 1 hurricane. However, it again encountered favorable conditions, which caused Isaac to re-intensify.

As Isaac tracked northwestward, it re-strengthened into a major hurricane on September 28. Later that day, Isaac peaked as a moderate-Category 4 hurricane. However, Isaac began to track northward over an area of colder sea surface temperatures (SSTs), which gradually weakened the storm over the next three days. Eventually, the storm curved northeastward, and weakened to a tropical storm early on October 1. Later that day, Isaac transitioned into an extratropical cyclone. While extratropical, Isaac brushed the British Isles, producing below gale-force winds. Isaac's extratropical remnants were eventually absorbed into another extratropical storm to the north of Scotland, on October 4. The storm had no interaction with land while tropical; however, one fatality occurred on Long Island when large swells generated by Isaac overturned a boat. In addition, rough seas also affected the coastlines of Bermuda and The Carolinas.

Meteorological history

A tropical wave emerged into the Atlantic from the west coast of Africa on September 20. The wave was associated with some curvature of deep convection. Later on September 20, the initial Dvorak classification was issued, whilst convection associated with the system began to consolidate. It is estimated that the wave became Tropical Depression Thirteen at 1200 UTC on September 21, while located south of Cape Verde. Although the QuikScat satellite recorded winds of up to 60 mph (90 km/h), the National Hurricane Center set the initial intensity 35 mph (55 km/h), mostly due to a lack of deep convection and an elongated and poorly defined center. Because upper-level winds were conductive, the depression strengthened and banding features significantly improved. As a result, the depression was upgraded to Tropical Storm Isaac early on September 22. A ridge was present over parts of the eastern Atlantic Ocean which provided strong steering currents.

Later on September 22, the National Hurricane Center began noting the possibility of increasing wind shear, due to a large upper trough. Despite this, the intensity predictions did not forecast weakening within the next three days. Isaac continued to strengthen and reached hurricane status at 1200 UTC on September 23. However, the National Hurricane Center did not operationally upgrade Isaac until 2100 UTC on September 23, at which time the storm was a Category 2 hurricane. Thereafter, Isaac significantly intensified, and on the following day, it reached an initial peak intensity with winds of 120 mph (205 km/h). The National Hurricane Center then predicted Isaac would become a Category 4 hurricane on September 25, though this did not materialize.

After reaching winds of 120 mph (205 km/h), Isaac slowly began weakening, due to both increasing vertical wind shear and internal fluctuations. By September 26, Isaac weakened to a moderate Category 1 hurricane, though the National Hurricane Center noted that re-strengthening was likely, citing the possibility of warming SST's. Wind shear began to decrease, which caused deep convection to re-organize into a more symmetrical pattern around the center of the storm. As a result, Isaac began re-intensifying, starting on September 27. Although Isaac re-developed a well-defined eye and a cold convective eyewall, only a portion of the storm had decent outflow. Three hours later, the National Hurricane Center noted that the storm had likely reached peak intensity, though further strengthening could not be ruled out. After tracking steadily west-northwestward or northwestward since it developed on September 21, the storm briefly curved northward western periphery of a mid-tropospheric anticyclone later on September 28. Further weakening occurred as Isaac tracked into decreasing SST's, while undergoing an eyewall replacement cycle. Late on September 29, the storm began curving east-northeastward and weakened to a Category 2 hurricane.

After weakening to a Category 1 hurricane on September 30, the National Hurricane Center noted that very cold cloud tops still existed, though IR imagery indicated that the convection and circulation associated with the storm was becoming asymmetrical. Isaac remained a Category 1 hurricane for almost 24 hours, at which time the storm began to accelerate east-northeastward. Early on October 1, the National Hurricane Center noted that minimal deep convection persisted near the center and much of it was displaced to the north. Mid-level dry air and low-level cold air began entering the western quadrant of the storm, which caused it to begin its extratropical transition. By 0600 UTC on October 1, Isaac weakened to a tropical storm. The National Hurricane Center noted that further weakening would be slow, due to the large wind field associated with the storm. At 1500 UTC on October 1, the National Hurricane Center issued its final advisory on the storm; Isaac fully transitioned into an extratropical cyclone about three hours later, while located about halfway between Newfoundland and the Azores. The extratropical remnants rapidly tracked east-northeastward and affected the British Isles on October 3 and October 4, eventually merging with another extratropical low while north of Scotland early on October 4.

Impact
Late on September 22 and early on September 23, the National Hurricane Center noted that due to several computer forecast models indicating a westward track, impact in the Lesser Antilles was possible, though unlikely. While Isaac made its closest approach to Bermuda on September 29, it produced high waves offshore the island. Although Isaac had stayed away from the eastern coast of the United States, the state of North Carolina issued a heavy surf warning on October 1, as swells from Isaac were predicted. Along the Grand Strand in South Carolina, rough surf and minor coastal flooding was reported. In New York, swells from the storm caused a boat with four passengers to overturn in Moriches Inlet on September 30. One of the passengers died from drowning. As an extratropical system, Isaac produced winds near gale-force on the British Isles during the day of October 3. After Isaac passed the British Isles, a bird called the blue-winged warbler was seen in Europe for the first time.

See also

Other storms of the same name
Timeline of the 2000 Atlantic hurricane season

Notes

References

External links

 Monthly Weather Review
 National Hurricane Center 2000 Atlantic hurricane season summary

Isaac (2000)
Isaac
Isaac (2000)
Isaac